Ferrick is a surname. Notable people with the surname include:

Colleen Ferrick (born 1942), New Zealand lawn bowler
Melissa Ferrick (born 1970), American singer-songwriter
Tom Ferrick (born 1949), American journalist, son of Tom
Tom Ferrick (1915–1996), American baseball player, coach, and scout